Ihor Lutsenko may refer to:

 Ihor Lutsenko (politician), Ukrainian politician
 Ihor Lutsenko (footballer), Ukrainian footballer